Cirith Ungol is an American heavy metal band formed in late 1971 in Ventura, California. This early doom and power metal group is known for lyrics based on fantasy (particularly sword and sorcery). The band took their name from the mountain pass Cirith Ungol in J. R. R. Tolkien's epic fantasy novel, The Lord of the Rings.

Throughout the 1970s, the band generally played a style of heavy metal heavily rooted in hard and progressive rock. Its first studio album, Frost and Fire (1981), featured a heavier sound, generally regarded as an early example of American power metal. By its second studio album, King of the Dead (1984), it had solidified its power metal style while gravitating toward a much "darker" sound, with many considering the album among the first doom metal releases.

History

Titanic 
Greg Lindstrom, Robert Garven, Jerry Fogle and Pat Galligan (later a guitarist in Angry Samoans) played in Titanic, their first band in junior high school. With a desire to play heavier music similar to that of Mountain and Grand Funk Railroad, the rest of the band parted with Galligan and founded Cirith Ungol in late 1971.

Early years 
After forming in late 1971, the band played their first gig on January 1, 1972, at an anti-Vietnam war peace rally.

In 1980, they were signed by Liquid Flames Records, and released their first album, Frost and Fire, with Tim Baker on vocals and songs written by bassist and guitarist Greg Lindstrom. It was described by some music journalists as 'The Worst Heavy Metal Album of All Time'. Their second album, King of the Dead was released in on July 2, 1984, and contained lyrics primarily written by vocalist Tim Baker and drummer Robert Garven. The album was then followed by One Foot in Hell on August 12, 1986 and Paradise Lost on August 23, 1991.

Disbandment 
They played their last live show on December 13, 1991 and disbanded in 1992 following frustration with their record label.

1992–2016 
In 2001, Metal Blade Records released in Germany Servants of Chaos, a compilation album of unreleased demos and live songs. With old tapes and assistance from Lindstrom and Garven, it was an attempt to give fans a wealth of archival and previously unheard material before the tapes deteriorated beyond retrieval. This double-CD was later re-released worldwide, with a rare 1984 live DVD recorded at Wolf & Rissmiller's Country Club in California.

Lindstrom now plays with Falcon, who perform some Cirith Ungol songs.

Founding guitarist Jerry Fogle died from liver failure on August 20, 1998.

Reunion 
The band was reformed by members Tim Baker, Robert Garven, Jim Barraza, and Greg Lindstrom on October 8, 2016, at the second annual Frost and Fire Festival in Ventura, California. Throughout 2017, the band had set out to headline and co-headline several European and US festivals, including Keep It True (Germany), Up the Hammers (Greece), Defenders of the Old (US), Chaos Descends (Germany), Psycho Las Vegas (US), Days of Darkness (US) and Hammer of Doom (Germany). In April 2018, Cirith Ungol performed at the Hell's Heroes Festival in Houston, Texas and at the NYDM Spring Bash in Milwaukee, Wisconsin.

In August 2018, Cirith Ungol released the single "Witch's Game". The full-length album Forever Black followed in 2020.

Name 
The band took their name from the mountain pass Cirith Ungol in J. R. R. Tolkien's fantasy novel The Lord of the Rings.  The name is Elvish and means "Pass of the Spider". While the place in Tolkien's book is pronounced "kirith ungol", the band pronounced it "sirith ungol". The band said:

Album cover art 
Each studio album's cover art is taken from the cover of a DAW Books edition of a book in Michael Moorcock's Elric of Melniboné saga; the art is by Michael Whelan.

Members

Current 
 Robert Garven – drums , lead vocals , backing vocals 
 Greg Lindstrom – guitars , bass guitar , keyboards , lead vocals , backing vocals 
 Tim Baker – lead vocals , keyboards , backing vocals , touring member 
 Jim "Jimmy" Barraza – guitars , backing vocals 
 Jarvis Leatherby – bass guitar 
 Armand Anthony – guitars

Former 
 Jerry Fogle – guitars 
 Neal Beattie – lead vocals 
 Michael "Flint" Vujea – bass guitar 
 Bob Warrensburg – bass guitar , backing vocals 
 Vernon Green – bass guitar

Timeline

Discography

Albums

Studio

EP

Live

Compilation 
Frost and Fire / King of the Dead (One Way; 1995, Canada)
Servants of Chaos (Metal Blade Records; 2001)

Box set
The Legacy (Metal Blade Records, 2017)

Mixtapes 
Untitled demo (self-released; 1978)

Singles 
"Witch's Game" (Metal Blade Records; 2018) in the film Planet of Doom
Brutish Manchild (Metal Blade 2021)

Other appearances 
Metal Massacre (compilation appearance, 1982)
The Metal Machine (compilation appearance, 1984)
Best of Metal Blade, Vol. 2 (compilation appearance, 1988)
Double Whammy (compilation appearance, 1999)
Metal Blade 20th Anniversary (compilation appearance, 2002)

Bootlegs 
Cirith Ungol (bootleg EP, 1979)
Live (bootleg single, 1996)

Notes

References

External links 

The Cirith Ungol Webpit
Official Falcon website

Heavy metal musical groups from California
American doom metal musical groups
American power metal musical groups
Musical groups established in 1972
Musical groups disestablished in 1992
Musical groups reestablished in 2016
Restless Records artists
Things named after Tolkien works